Nicolai Niels Nielsen (3 March 1777 – 10 July 1854) was a Norwegian priest and politician.

 
He was born in  the village Balbro on Funen, Denmark. He took his Cand.theol.  in Copenhagen in 1804, and initially worked as a teacher in Zealand. In 1807 he moved to Norway, becoming a priest in Vardøe in Finnmark. In 1810 he relocated to Holmedal in Sunnfjord.

He was a member of the Norwegian Constitutional Assembly at Eidsvoll in 1814. Together with  Lars Johannes Irgens and Peder Hjermann, he was a representative of Nordre Bergenhuus (now Sogn og Fjordane). He primarily supported the position of the Independence Party (Selvstendighetspartiet) 

Nielsen was appointed priest in Eid in Nordfjord  during 1821, and dean  at the Indre Sogn deanery in Borgund in Sogn og Fjordane from 1835. While stationed in Eid, he was elected to the Norwegian Parliament in 1830, representing the constituency of Nordre Bergenhus Amt (now Sogn og Fjordane). His primary interest was education policy.

References

1777 births
1854 deaths
Fathers of the Constitution of Norway
Members of the Storting
Sogn og Fjordane politicians
Norwegian priest-politicians
Danish emigrants to Norway